Roh Joo-hyun (born Roh Un-young on August 19, 1946) is a South Korean actor.

Filmography

Film

Television series

Variety/Radio Show

News Show

Theater

Ambassadorship 
 Ambassador of Public Relations to Seoul (2023)

Awards and nominations

References

External links 
 
 
 

1946 births
Living people
South Korean male television actors
South Korean male film actors
South Korean male musical theatre actors
South Korean male stage actors
Gwangsan No clan